Djevencio van der Kust (born 30 April 2001) is a Dutch professional footballer who plays as a defender for Houston Dynamo on loan from FC Utrecht.

Club career

Utrecht 
After playing youth football for AVV Zeeburgia, Van der Kust joined FC Utrecht's academy in 2012. He signed his first professional contract with Utrecht in December 2019, with the deal valid until mid-2022 with the option of a year's extension. Van der Kust made his debut for Jong Utrecht on 10 January 2020 in a 2–1 defeat to De Graafschap.  He ended the season with 2 appearances for Jong Utrecht, playing primarily with the U-19 side. He scored his first career goal on 24 November 2020 in a 1–1 draw with Jong PSV.  During the 2020–21 season he established himself as a regular for Jong Utrecht, making 26 appearances and scoring 1 goal.

On 15 August 2021 he made his Eredivisie debut for Utrecht in matchweek 1 of the 2021–22 season, coming on as a substitute in a 4–0 win over Sparta Rotterdam.  On 9 November van der Kust signed a new contract lasting until 2025. He made his first start for Utrecht on 5 February 2022 in a 3–2 win over SC Cambuur.  Van der Kust started 11 of Utrechts final 14 Eredivisie matches, helping them to a 7th place finish.  He also started both of Utrecht's European playoff matches, a 4–3 aggregate loss to Vitesse.  He made 17 appearances and scored 1 goal for Jong Utrecht during the season.

Van der Kust started the 2022–23 season as the first choice leftback, appearing in 8 of the first 10 Eredivisie games with 7 starts and starting a KNVB Cup game.  He then lost his spot in the first team, appearing in just 1 of the next 12 matches, his 1 appearance being a substitute in a cup match, and playing in 3 matches for Jong Utrecht.

Houston Dynamo 
On 9 February 2023, Van der Kust signed for Major League Soccer side Houston Dynamo on loan with an option to buy.

Career statistics

Personal life
Born in the Netherlands, Van der Kust is of Surinamese descent.

References

External links

2001 births
Living people
Dutch footballers
Dutch sportspeople of Surinamese descent
Association football fullbacks
Jong FC Utrecht players
FC Utrecht players
Houston Dynamo FC players
Eerste Divisie players
Eredivisie players